Mirza Melkum Khan - Joseph (Hovsep) Melkumyan (1834–1908), also spelled as Melkum Khan, was an Iranian modernist writer, diplomat, and publicist. He is known for his social reform efforts, as well as for being the first Christian to adopt the title of 'Mirza' in Persian. He is considered one of the fathers of the Iranian Constitutional Revolution.

Biography
Melkum Khan was born to an Armenian Christian family in Iran and educated at the Samuel Muradian school in Paris from 1843 to 1851. He later returned to Iran and entered government service. He was elected as instructor at the newly established Polytechnic in Tehran called Dar ul-Funun, in 1852. He went to Paris in the diplomatic service in 1857.

Melkum Khan introduced societies similar to the Freemasons in Iran in 1859, and was exiled by Nasser ad-Din Shah for doing so in 1862. He was later pardoned and given a post at the embassy in Constantinople. There, two years later, he married the daughter of Arakel, a prominent Armenian, with the ceremony taking place in an Armenian church. He returned to Tehran in 1872 as assistant to Grand Vizier Mirza Hosein Khan Moshir od-Dowleh, and became the chief of the Persian legation in London (and later ambassador) in 1872.  He remained in the position until 1888, and lost his position in 1889 as the result of a scandal over selling a cancelled concession for a lottery. Nasereddin Shah explains in his third trip's memoir, how he went to Mirza Melkum Khan's house an evening, met his wife and his three daughters two of them as old as 19-20 and the third one who was 6 at the time (1889).

From London, Melkum Khan attacked both the shah and Iranian government, and edited the news-sheet Qanun, which was banned in Iran but read by the shah and his ministers. Melkum Khan eventually became recognized as the most important Persian moderniser of the century, and he was later pardoned and reinstated as ambassador to Italy by Mozaffar ad-Din Shah in 1898 with the title of Nezam od-Dowleh.  He remained ambassador to Italy until his death in 1908.

References

Further reading
 Mehrdad Kia, Pan-Islamism in Late Nineteenth-Century Iran, Middle Eastern Studies, Vol. 32, No. 1, pp. 30-52 (1996).

1834 births
1908 deaths
Converts to Islam from Christianity
People of the Persian Constitutional Revolution
Persian Armenians
Iranian former Christians
Armenian former Christians
Iranian expatriates in France
Creators of writing systems
Ambassadors of Iran to Italy
Ambassadors of Iran to Germany
Ambassadors of Iran to Austria
Ambassadors of Iran to the United Kingdom
19th-century Iranian politicians
Iranian expatriates in Italy
Iranian newspaper publishers (people)
19th-century Iranian writers